In mathematics, computer science and economics, an optimization problem is the problem of finding the best solution from all feasible solutions.

Optimization problems can be divided into two categories, depending on whether the variables are continuous or discrete: 
 An optimization problem with discrete variables is known as a discrete optimization, in which an object such as an integer, permutation or graph must be found from a countable set. 
 A problem with continuous variables is known as a continuous optimization, in which an optimal value from a continuous function must be found. They can include constrained problems and multimodal problems.

Continuous optimization problem

The standard form of a continuous optimization problem is

where
  is the objective function to be minimized over the -variable vector ,
  are called inequality constraints
  are called equality constraints, and

If , the problem is an unconstrained optimization problem. By convention, the standard form defines a minimization problem. A maximization problem can be treated by negating the objective function.

Combinatorial optimization problem

Formally, a combinatorial optimization problem  is a quadruple , where
  is a set of instances;
 given an instance ,  is the set of feasible solutions;

The goal is then to find for some instance  an optimal solution, that is, a feasible solution  with

For each combinatorial optimization problem, there is a corresponding decision problem that asks whether there is a feasible solution for some particular measure . This problem might have an answer of, say, 4. This problem can be answered with a simple 'yes' or 'no'.

In the field of approximation algorithms, algorithms are designed to find near-optimal solutions to hard problems. The usual decision version is then an inadequate definition of the problem since it only specifies acceptable solutions. Even though we could introduce suitable decision problems, the problem is more naturally characterized as an optimization problem.

See also

 
 
 
 
 
 
  − the optimum need not be found, just a "good enough" solution.

References

External links

 

Computational problems